Thomas John Plant (born November 6, 1957) is an American former speed skater.

He took part in 1980 Winter Games in Lake Placid.

He won a bronze medal at the 1980 Sprint Championships.

References
 Plants PRs on Jakub Majerski's Speedskating Database
 Tom Plant at SpeedSkatingStats.com

External links
 
 
 
 
 Tom Plant at Team USA

1957 births
Living people
American male speed skaters
Olympic speed skaters of the United States
Speed skaters at the 1980 Winter Olympics
World Sprint Speed Skating Championships medalists